Jagvir Singh Sidhu (born 4 January 2001) is a Danish professional footballer who plays as a winger for Danish 1st Division club Fredericia.

Career

Early career
Born in Greve Strand, Singh began playing football at an early age in the youth academy of Brøndby, a club his parents supported. At U15-level, he joined Lyngby Boldklub, where he played for a year before moving to the youth department of HIK.

Singh made his senior debut on 3 August 2019 in a third-tier 2nd Division match against Avarta. He made five total appearances for the club, including one in the Danish Cup.

Brøndby
On 1 September 2019, Singh moved to the Brøndby IF academy, where he was including in their U19 team. Singh was included in the newly established U20 team in May 2020, which was announced by director of football Carsten V. Jensen. He received a one-year contract extension as part of the new team, alongside fellow under-19 graduates Jacob Rasmussen, Emil Staugaard and Andreas Pyndt.

On 20 December 2020, Singh first appeared in Brøndby's first-team matchday squad in their Superliga tie against Horsens, remaining as an unused substitute in the 2–1 victory He would mostly appear in the U19 league that season, making 15 appearances in which he scored 12 goals.

Singh made his professional debut on 25 July 2021, coming on as a substitute in the 83rd minute of a 1–1 draw in the Danish Superliga against Viborg FF. He scored his first senior goal on 23 September, in an 8–1 away win over Allerød FK in the Danish Cup. Singh made his European debut on 9 December in the UEFA Europa League group stage match against Sparta Prague, coming on as a 72nd-minute substitute for Simon Hedlund in a 2–0 loss away at Stadion Letná.

Fredericia
Singh signed a three-year deal with Fredericia for an undisclosed fee. He made his debut for Fredericia in a 2–2 away draw against Nykøbing FC on the first matchday of the 2022–23 season, coming on in the 64th minute in place of Adam Jakobsen. He twisted his ankle in practice a few days later and missed the next three games. He returned in action on 17 August, coming on as a late substitute in a 2–1 loss to newly promoted Hillerød Fodbold. On 26 August, Singh scored his first Fredericia goal, curling in a shot in the far corner to secure a 3–3 away draw against Fremad Amager at Sundby Idrætspark.

Career statistics

References

External links

2001 births
Living people
Danish people of Indian descent
Danish men's footballers
Brøndby IF players
Lyngby Boldklub players
Hellerup IK players
FC Fredericia players
Association football midfielders
Danish 2nd Division players
Danish 1st Division players
Danish Superliga players
People from Greve Municipality
Sportspeople from Region Zealand